Carl Anders Lorent Johansson (born 23 May 1994) is a Swedish footballer who plays for Randers FC, on loan from IFK Göteborg, as a defender.

Career
He made his Allsvenskan debut for Helsingborgs IF on 15 September 2013 against BK Häcken. He was born in Lund but grew up in Höör.

References

External links

1994 births
Sportspeople from Lund
Living people
Footballers from Skåne County
Swedish footballers
Sweden under-21 international footballers
Allsvenskan players
Superettan players
Danish Superliga players
Helsingborgs IF players
Falkenbergs FF players
IFK Göteborg players
Randers FC players
Association football defenders